Waitakere was a parliamentary electorate, returning one Member of Parliament to the New Zealand House of Representatives.

Population centres
The 1941 New Zealand census had been postponed due to World War II, so the 1946 electoral redistribution had to take ten years of population growth and movements into account. The North Island gained a further two electorates from the South Island due to faster population growth. The abolition of the country quota through the Electoral Amendment Act, 1945 reduced the number and increased the size of rural electorates. None of the existing electorates remained unchanged, 27 electorates were abolished, eight former electorates were re-established, and 19 electorates were created for the first time, including Waitakere.

Waitakere was based around the western suburbs of Auckland. Given the nature of population growth in greater Auckland, and the addition of three new seats in Auckland, the boundaries of Waitakere moved around at every electoral redistribution; in 1999, they were moved northwards as far as Helensville before being pulled back south three years later. In its last boundaries before abolition, the electorate included the Waitakere City suburbs of Henderson, Rānui and Swanson before heading west over the Waitākere Ranges to Piha.

Waitakere was first abolished in the 1967 electoral redistribution, which resulted from the Electoral Act 1965 that fixed the number of South Island electorates at 25. As a result, three additional electorates were created in the North Island, and one additional in the South Island.

The 1987 electoral redistribution took the continued population growth in the North Island into account, and two additional general electorates were created, bringing the total number of electorates to 97. In the South Island, the shift of population to Christchurch had continued. Overall, three electorates were newly created, three electorates were recreated, and four electorates were abolished (including Waitakere). All of those electorates were in the North Island. Changes in the South Island were restricted to boundary changes.

History
The Waitakere electorate existed from the 1946 election to 1969, and from the 1978 election to 1987. This seat was held in an unbroken run by Labour for the whole of these two periods.

The name Waitakere was reclaimed and applied to a new seat in 1993, which was expanded ahead of the introduction of Mixed Member Proportional (MMP) voting in 1996 election at the expense of the former seats of Henderson and Titirangi.

A high turnout for the Alliance in West Auckland in 1996 split the left wing vote and denied then-Titirangi MP and Waitakere candidate Suzanne Sinclair re-election to Parliament, to the benefit of Marie Hasler, also a former Titirangi MP. In 2002 Lynne Pillay was elected over Alliance leader Laila Harré. In 2005 Pillay was re-elected with a five thousand vote majority over National's Paula Bennett. In a nationwide swing towards the National Party in 2008 Bennett managed to unseat Pillay, with a majority of 632.

Carmel Sepuloni was selected by the Labour Party to challenge Paula Bennett for her seat in 2011. On election night, Paula Bennett was thought to have held the seat by 349 votes but after counting 3,130 special votes it was determined that Carmel Sepuloni had won by 11 votes. The National Party requested a judicial recount due to the tightness of the competition (Labour did the same in Christchurch Central, where the Labour candidate was beaten by 45 votes). The outcome of Waitakere's recount was released on 17 December 2011, returning Paula Bennett with a nine-vote majority. The margin was two orders of magnitude smaller than the number of voters who voted while not being on the electoral role, 393.

In November 2013, it was proposed that the Waitakere electorate be abolished for the 2014 general election. The electorate was mainly subsumed by Helensville, Te Atatū, and the new Kelston electorate, with a small section moving to the new Upper Harbour electorate.

Members of Parliament
Key

List MPs
Members of Parliament elected from party lists in elections where that person also unsuccessfully contested the Waitakere electorate. Unless otherwise stated, all MPs terms began and ended at general elections.

Election results

2011 election
Due to the closeness of the election in Waitakere a judicial recount was undertaken on 16 December and it was confirmed that Bennett has beaten Sepuloni by nine votes on 17 December.

 

Electorate (as at 26 November 2011): 43,143

2008 election

2005 election

2002 election

1999 election
Refer to Candidates in the New Zealand general election 1999 by electorate#Waitakere for a list of candidates.

1993 election

1984 election

1981 election

1978 election

1966 election

1963 election

1960 election

1957 election

1954 election

1951 election

1949 election

1946 election

Notes

References

External links
Electorate Profile  Parliamentary Library

Historical electorates of New Zealand
Politics of the Auckland Region
1946 establishments in New Zealand
1987 disestablishments in New Zealand
1993 establishments in New Zealand
2014 disestablishments in New Zealand
1969 disestablishments in New Zealand
1978 establishments in New Zealand